Claxton is a civil parish in County Durham, England. It had a population of 25 at the 2001 Census.

History 
Claxton was a township in Greatham parish. In 1866 Caxton became a civil parish in its own right.

References

Civil parishes in County Durham